Jean-Claude Courveille (15 May 1787 – 15 September 1866) was a Catholic priest who took the initiative of establishing the Marists, or Society of Mary, of which he was the first superior general. Following a scandal, he retired to Cistercian abbey of Notre-Dame of Aiguebelle, then Saint-Antoine-l'Abbaye and finally to the Benedictine Solesmes Abbey, where he died.

Early years

Jean-Claude Courveille was the son of Marguerite Beynieux and Claude Courveille, a merchant of Usson-en-Forez. 
He was born in this town on 15 May 1787. 
During the French Revolution his parents, devout Catholics, hid in their house a statue of the Virgin that was venerated in the village as "Our Lady of Chambriac" and was said to have miraculous powers.
The boy suffered from smallpox in 1797, and injury to his cornea made him half-blind. He lost his father in 1805.

The statue of Our Lady of Le Puy-en-Velay in Le Puy Cathedral was burned during the revolution on 8 June 1794 by Louis Guyardin, who had been sent by the National Convention to the department of Haute-Loire.
Despite this, in 1809 Courveille went on a pilgrimage to the cathedral of Le Puy-en-Velay. 
He said he was cured of his blindness by means of the Virgin and decided, in thanksgiving, to devote himself to the service of Mary.
His historians have noted that when he spoke of the Virgin all his listeners fell under his charm.

Courveille entered the minor seminary of Verrières-en-Forez.
There he had as classmate Marcellin Champagnat.
He then continued his studies of Latin at the home of his maternal uncle, Mathieu Beynieux, then pastor of Apinac. 
The seminarian again made a pilgrimage to Puy-en-Velay. As he prayed in the cathedral on 25 August 1812 he claimed to have received a revelation of the Virgin who wanted to have a religious congregation under the name of Mary.
"Since this moment, very often, he seemed to hear an inner voice, that of the Mother of God, asking him to found the Society of Mary. 
On one day he attended six consecutive Masses to get rid of what he considered to be an illusion".

On All Saints' Day in 1812 Courveille entered the seminary of Le Puy-en-Velay, but had to leave to join that of St. Irenaeus of Lyon, as the Concordat had attached his parish of origin to this diocese.

The transfer took place at the start of 1813, and Jean-Claude Courville found Marcellin Champagnat again, and made the acquaintance of Jean-Claude-Marie Colin and Jean-Marie Vianney, who had also been admitted to the major seminary of Lyon.
He spoke of his projected Society of Mary to Colin and Champagnat.
"His mystique was curiously also subservient to the politics of the moment: he naively believed that Louis XVIII of France would be a great Marist, 
even the miracle worker of Notre Dame."

Priest and Superior General

The ordination of Courveille, Champagnat and Colin took place on 22 July 1816. The next day they and nine other companions climbed the hill to the Basilica of Notre-Dame de Fourvière to celebrate their first Mass. There the twelve priests made a solemn commitment to devote themselves to the Virgin and to found a Society of Mary.
They also agreed to "serve the Church in the form of the most diverse commitments."
Jean-Claude Courville was appointed curate of Verrières-en-Forez, a position he held from 1817, then at Rive-de-Gier where he remained until 1819, when he became pastor of Épercieux-Saint-Paul, a post he left in 1824. It was at Épercieux that he wrote his notes on the creation of a Marist third order.

Courveille, jointly with Champagnat, the curate at La Valla-en-Gier, purchased a house there that would become the first house of the Marist Brothers. 
As Superior General, Courveille issued a rule to the brothers and then, in 1822, opened a school in Feurs while also making efforts to establish another in Charlieu.
His biographer notes that, "sky-blue was his favorite color: he wore a blue coat and imposed the blue costume on the Brothers."

The Archbishop of Lyon was then Joseph Fesch, uncle of the former Emperor, Napoleon Bonaparte. As Fesch did not reside in Lyon, an apostolic administrator was appointed by Rome to govern the diocese. Upon taking office in 1823 the administrator, Archbishop Jean-Paul Gaston de Pins, became worried by the activism of the superior of the Marists. He tried to moderate Courveille's zeal by appointing Champagnat to lead the congregation in his place.
Courveille's activity was confined to the Petits Frères de Marie (Little Brothers of Mary).
But a year later Champagnat, whose health was poor, had Courveille reinstated as head of the Marist Brothers. 
Being superior general once more, Courveille bought the site of the Hermitage, near Saint-Chamond, Loire, which became the parent house of the congregation.

Controversy and resignation

Having noted that there had arisen "a controversy over his role in the Society of Mary", one of the historians to treat Courveille's history most recently, Gabriel Trénard, ends his treatment of Courveille life at 1824, explaining that subsequently several immoral episodes forced Courveille to leave the Marists.
As to whether Courveille or Champagnat should be regarded as the true founder of the congregation, Trénard considers it prudent to leave the question open, writing, "Ultimately, Courveille's role in creating the Society of Mary is not well known." However, the Marist Brothers themselves have had no hesitation from early times in consistently recognizing Marcellin Champagnat as their founder. 

The first morality case that triggered an investigation, Archbishop Gaston de Pins entrusted to Father Barou, one of the vicars general. 
Another biographer of Jean-Claude Courville was Brother Louis-Laurent, a Marist. He said that in 1826 there had been serious errors in the Hermitage and Father Courveille had to assume "on his head the dreaded sentence of our Divine Savior: But whoso shall cause one of these little ones who believe in Me to fall, it were better for him that a millstone were hung about his neck, and that he were drowned in the depth of the sea".

The scandal was officially revealed for the first time in 1868 when it was admitted by the congregation that their founder had "compromised with a young postulant" in the month of April 1826. The youth had denounced Courveille to Father Terraillon, who made a report to the archdiocese. Terraillon said that until now, "Courveille was still looked upon everywhere as a saint, and he really was so until this time".

Courveille went to a retreat in the Cistercian Aiguebelle Abbey during the week before Pentecost of 1826. A month later that he wrote on 4 June to Champagnat, "priest and father Director of the Little Brothers of Mary". He praised the special rule of the Trappists who had received him and the harsh discipline imposed by their superior, saying he wanted to retire there.
As Louis-Laurent notes "His repressed sentimentality changed into a more and more exaggerated severity and a craving for tyrannical authority, 
as if taking an unhealthy pleasure in contemplating those who fought against the impossible."

Champagnat and Terraillon could not agree whether to accept Courveille's resignation. 
The next day Jean-Claude Colin arrived. He sided with Champagnat in preferring to refuse it. 
Étienne Terraillon again gave his view that the resignation should be accepted now. He said Courveille still had the reputation of a saint.
There might be no future opportunity to remove him, and they would be implicated if there were further problems with Courveille's behavior.
He succeeded in convincing Champagnat, who co-signed a letter from Terraillon saying the resignation was accepted.

Having accomplished his mission, Terraillon left Hermitage leaving Champagnat deal with their decision. He had only yielded when his colleague had told him of the conduct of the man he had hitherto always considered his Superior General and the only founder of the Society of Mary.

Later career
 
Courveille did not stay in Aiguebelle. 
He preferred to retire with his Marist Sisters of Saint-Clair-du-Rhône, after Colin had refused to receive him in Belley.
His de facto exclusion did not make Father Courveille renounce his mission as founder of the Society of Mary. 
He set his sights on the ancient abbey of Saint-Antoine in the Isère to establish a new group with the support of the Bishop of Grenoble, Philibert de Bruillard, and of Jules de Calvières, prefect of Isère.

Courveille bought a part of the abbey for 60,000 francs and was joined by some Brothers who left the Hermitage. 
On 10 December 1826 the municipality of Saint-Antoine voted 220 francs to provide the brothers of the Congregation of Mary some tables with benches and a chair for monitoring the class. Two days later, the prefectorial order agreed to pay a first sum of 1,600 francs assistance to M. le général de la Société des Petits Frères, 
who had promised to provide school teachers to the municipalities who requested them.

Courveille soon gathered around him a dozen young people interested in becoming religious teachers.
He completed his staff with Marist Sisters of Saint-Clair-du-Rhône who he installed at San Antonio to open a school for girls there. 
But he could not meet his commitments and was deprived of his subsidies. 
The brothers left Saint-Antoine and only the Sisters were allowed to stay by a Royal Decree of 21 December 1828.

On 8 July 1829 the Council of the Apostolic Administrator of Lyon, Jean-Paul-Gaston de Pins, was willing to grant Courveille medical discharge, if he so requested. But the request was never made. After All Saints Day, he went to stay with his maternal uncle, still priest of Apinac. 
This is where on 21 May 1830 he signed a final act of renunciation in favor of Champagnat. 
At the pastoral retreat of 1832, he tried one last approach to the congregation to recover his place. 
Father Colin told him, "Do you think we are not aware of your behavior?" Courveille took the hint.

Rejected by the Society, Courveille decided to lead a hermit's life. He built a hermitage and chapel near the church of Apinac, 
and in doing so again acquired a great reputation for holiness.
But in caring for children his past caught up with him. Convicted of new offenses, he finally left his uncle's parish.

In spring 1834 Courveille went to Le Mans, where the bishop, Jean-Baptiste Bouvier, considered him a "zealous and virtuous priest". 
There he entered into relations with Prosper Guéranger, a Benedictine, who had restored Solesmes Abbey in 1833. 
On 27 August 1836 Courveille took the habit there, and on 21 March 1838, at the age of 51, Dom Courveille made monastic profession. 
Charged for two years (1839–1840) with the lay brothers of the abbey, he had to abandon any responsibility in 1860, crippled and paralyzed in his hands by gout. 
Dom Jean-Claude Courville lived for six more years, and died on 15 September 1866, aged 79 years.

References

Sources

1787 births
1855 deaths
Founders of Catholic religious communities
19th-century French Roman Catholic priests
Marist Brothers